Aidan O'Shea (born 29 June 1990) is a Gaelic footballer who plays for Breaffy and the Mayo county team. He is captain of the senior team at Breaffy.

Career
O'Shea made his debut for the Mayo seniors against New York in 2009 and since then has been one of Mayo's best players, winning an All-Star in 2013 and playing in midfield in two All-Ireland football finals, the 2012 decider, which Mayo lost by 0–13 to 2–11 against Donegal and the 2013 decider, which Mayo lost by 1–14 to 2–12 against Dublin. In 2013, his man-of-the-match display drove Mayo to a 16-point victory in a rematch against 2012 conquerors Donegal at the All-Ireland quarter-final stage. He was afterwards refused entry at one of Dublin's biggest nightclubs. He was awarded the GAA's Player of the Month for August 2013.

He played in the first Test for Ireland against Australia in the 2013 International Rules Series, but club commitments ruled him out of the second Test. He is suspected of being concussed up to seven times. In 2016 Mayo were denied another All-Ireland title by just one point to Dublin after a replay on 1 October. Coincidentally the following year Mayo lost again against Dublin in the 2017 All-Ireland Senior Football Championship Final by another one-point margin.
O'Shea has lost in a lot of All-Ireland finals along with Lee Keegan,2012,2013,2016, 2017, 2020, and 2021.

Personal life
O'Shea had a relationship with Sarah Rowe, the  ladies' Gaelic footballer.

Career statistics

Honours

Dublin Institute of Technology
Sigerson Cup: 2013

Mayo
Connacht Senior Football Championship: 2009, 2011, 2012, 2013, 2014, 2015, 2020 (c), 2021 (c)
National Football League: 2019
Connacht Under-21 Football Championship: 2009
Connacht Minor Football Championship: 2009
 FBD League: 2011, 2012, 2023
Ireland
International Rules Series: 2013, 2015

References

1990 births
Living people
Mayo inter-county Gaelic footballers
Irish international rules football players
People educated at St Gerald's College, Castlebar
People from Mullingar